Military Museum station is an interchange station on Line 1 and Line 9 of the Beijing Subway. It located near the Military Museum of the Chinese People's Revolution. Line 9 did not stop at this station until 21 December 2013.

Transfer
The transfer hall between Line 1 and Line 9 opened on 21 December 2013.

Station Layout 
Both the line 1 and 9 stations have island platforms.

Exits 
The station has 9 exits, lettered A, B, C1, C2, D, E1, E2, G, and H. Exit A is accessible.

Gallery

References

Beijing Subway stations in Haidian District
Railway stations in China opened in 1971